NGC 7838 is a spiral or lenticular galaxy located about 500 million light-years away in the constellation of Pisces. The galaxy was discovered by astronomer Albert Marth on November 29, 1864. NGC 7838 appears to interact with NGC 7837 forming Arp 246.

See also 
 List of NGC objects (7001–7840)

References

External links 
 

7838
246
525
Pisces (constellation)
Astronomical objects discovered in 1864
Spiral galaxies
Lenticular galaxies
Discoveries by Albert Marth